Paul Conrad Zehrer (born October 10, 1963, in Sauk Centre, Minnesota) is an American film and television director, writer, producer, and editor.  He was raised on a dairy farm and worked as a beekeeper before studying Philosophy at Vassar College.  He later moved to New York City, where he began his filmmaking career.

Zehrer's directorial debut, Blessing, which captures the rhythms and rituals of Midwestern farm life, received an Independent Spirit Award nomination for Best First Screenplay.

He also directed the Emmy-nominated Blue's Clues (Nickelodeon), was an editor for Frontline (PBS), and has edited a number of feature documentaries, including "Listen Up: The Lives of Quincy Jones" and PBS' "Picasso Paints Picasso".

Awards and nominations 
 Independent Spirit Award, Best First Screenplay - Blessing (nomination)
 Emmy Award, Best Director - Blue's Clues (nomination)
 Sundance Grand Jury Prize - Blessing (nomination)
 Heart of America Award, Best Feature - Blessing
 Gold Jury Award, Houston International Film Festival - Blessing
 Critic's Award, Deauville Film Festival - Blessing (nomination)

References

External links 
 
 

1963 births
Vassar College alumni
Living people
American television directors
Film directors from Minnesota
People from Sauk Centre, Minnesota